Buchloe station is the only station in the town of Buchloe in the German state of Bavaria. It is at the junction of the Augsburg–Buchloe and Buchloe–Memmingen, Munich–Buchloe and the Buchloe–Lindau railways.

History

Buchloe station was established with the Augsburg–Kaufbeuren railway, which opened on 1 September 1847. The station building was completed a year later on 15 October 1848. The station at that time was about a kilometre from the town of Buchloe. The town then had about 850 inhabitants and was selected as one of eleven waterering points and stations for handling fast freight between Augsburg and Lindau. A loading dock in the loading shed for three wagons and a cattle ramp were built after the construction of the station building. Similarly, there was a 35-metre long carriage shed, where minor repairs could be made. A few years later, many houses were built along Bahnhofstrasse (station street). Business increased with the construction of the Munich–Memmingen line through Buchloe. The old freight shed and the carriage shed were later replaced by a new freight shed, a locomotive shed with two tracks and an accommodation building.  A building for the office of the track supervisor (Bahnmeisterei) and other buildings were also built. On 1 May 1897, the Buchloe North and Buchloe South mechanical signal boxes were built.

Station building

The original brick station building opened in 1848 was built by local craftsmen. The price was 15,197 guilders. It was a local freight office and contained a ticket office, a luggage room, waiting rooms for first and second class and various offices for operations. The building had three round arched entrances and a clock tower and bell. On the first floor were the apartments of the station manager and the track supervisor. The post office and telegraph services were also housed in the building. The main station building was demolished in 1873 and rebuilt for 160,000 guilders; other station buildings were renovated. On the first floor of the new station building there were flats at the back.

Current building since 1967

The station building built in 1873 was demolished in 1967. A new concrete building was constructed, which still exists today. It includes a counter, which is open each day, a kiosk and a small waiting area. There are three ticket machines. Two are located here next to the entrance to the station building from the north, one is in the passageway to Karwendelstraße.

Proposed new construction

Plans for construction of a new station building are almost finished. The new building would consist of two building structures connected by a covered patio, which would be more comfortable for passengers and visitors to the town. The station building may accommodate a travel centre, a bookstore, a fast food restaurant, a retailer of travel supplies and a bakery, as well as public toilets. The cost of the project is estimated at about €2 million, with the town of Buchloe funding more than €500,000. The project has overwhelmingly local support.  Also planned is the construction of a central bus station and the associated redesign of the station forecourt.

Operations

Long distance services

Regional services

Notes

References

 

Railway stations in Bavaria
Railway stations in Germany opened in 1847
1847 establishments in Bavaria